Pontneddfechan, also known as Pontneathvaughan (pronounced ) ("bridge over the Little Neath" in Welsh) is the southernmost village in the county of Brecknockshire, Wales, within the Vale of Neath, in the community of Ystradfellte and in the principal area of Powys. It stands at the confluence of the rivers Mellte and Nedd Fechan ("Neath Vaughan") and gives access to a series of waterfalls that adorn the upper Neath valley. Dinas Rock is a quarried limestone promontory east of the village, popular with visitors.

History
District industrial activities started with a 21-year lease of an area from the Marquess of Bute by the Quaker entrepreneur William Weston Young, for mining silica rock round Craig-y-Ddinas from 1822 onwards. The silica was extracted for firebricks at the Dinas Firebrick Co. in Pont Walby. In 1843, Young's lease ran out and the then Riddles, Young & Co. firebrick makers moved to new premises on The Green, Neath. The stone sleepers for the silica mine tramway can still be seen in the path of the waterfall walk.

In 1857, the Vale of Neath Powder Co. built a "gunpowder manufactory", having obtained "a licence to erect their mills over a space of two miles including the Upper and Lower Cilliepste Falls". The site on the Mellte was chosen for remoteness and the availability of water power and timber for producing charcoal, an ingredient of gunpowder. An inclined tramway wfrom a siding on the Vale of Neath Railway near Pen-cae-drain, brought in sulphur and saltpetre, the other ingredients. The buildings were linked by a horse-drawn tramway, whose horses wore copper horseshoes to reduce the likelihood of sparks. In 1862, Curtis & Harvey took over the site, later merging with Nobel's Explosives Co. and being absorbed by Imperial Chemical Industries in 1926. It then closed in 1931, but the site is still known locally as the Gunpowder Works. It is administered by the National Park Authority and has a network of footpaths.

The Welsh-language poet Evan Bevan died at Pontneddfechan in 1866.

See also
Dyffrynnoedd Nedd a Mellte, a Moel Penderyn

References

Map sources

External links
www.geograph.co.uk : photos of Pontneddfechan and surrounding area
Ebenezer Calvinist Methodist Chapel memorial transcripts

Vale of Neath
Villages in Powys